Clyde O. Martz (August 14, 1920 – May 18, 2010) was an American attorney who served as the United States Assistant Attorney General for the Environment and Natural Resources from 1967 to 1969.

He died on May 18, 2010, in Albuquerque, New Mexico at age 89.

References

1920 births
2010 deaths
United States Assistant Attorneys General for the Environment and Natural Resources Division